Vlatko Grozdanoski (born 30 January 1983 in Skopje, SR Macedonia, Yugoslavia) is a Macedonian retired footballer who finished his career with FK Vardar in the First Macedonian Football League and was also a player on the Macedonia national team.

Club career
He began his career in 1999, playing for Cementarnica 55 Skopje. His first game for that team was in the Macedonian First League on 25 March 2000 against Vardar Skopje when Vlatko was only 17 years and 2 months. He played with Cementarnica 55 Skopje in the Macedonian Cup Final vs. FK Pobeda. He stayed with Cementarnica 55 Skopje until December 2002, when he signed to play for Vardar Skopje, where he remained for 1 year and 7 months before he signed for Omonia Nicosia in 2004. During the 2001–2002 season he won the best young player award in the Macedonian First League. With Vardar Skopje he won the Macedonian First League Title. He also participated in the Champions League with Vardar, who fell 1 game short of qualifying for the Champions League group stage. He scored against CSKA Moscow in Moscow where Vardar Skopje won 2:1. In the summer of 2004 he signed for the most famous team in Cyprus, Omonia Nicosia. As an Omonia Nicosia player, he won the Cypriot Cup and the Super Cup in 2005. He wore the number seven jersey for Omonia Nicosia. Vlatko was awarded the best young foreign player in Cypriot First Division for the 2006/2007 season. In January 2008 he signed a 2-year contract with FK Vojvodina. In the first 6 months he had great performances, scoring 5 goals in 13 games. For FK Vojvodina Vlatko played 37 games and scored 7 goals in all competition. He has recently signed a 1.5-year contract with the AEL Limassol football team. His first game for AEL Limassol was on 1 March 2010 against Nea Salamis Famagusta FC when coach Dušan Uhrin, Jr. give him chance to play in the last 20 minutes. Vlatko scored his first goal in the yellow shirt on the game against Enosis Neon Paralimni FC on 27 March 2010. On 12 August Vlatko signed a 1-year contract with Damash Iranian F.C. After his contract expired, he decided to go back to the Macedonian League and signed for Rabotnički. Later he signed with the best club in Macedonia, FK Vardar.

International career
He debut for the national team when he was just 18 years old against Oman (30 December 2001). He scored his first goal for Macedonia against Turkey national football team in a EURO 2004 qualifying match on 12 October 2002. He then followed that up with another goals against Turkey in another EURO 2004 qualifying match on 11 June 2003, against Estonia in a friendly match on 11 June 2004 and against Luxembourg on 20 August 2008. As of now, he has 50 caps and 4 goals for Republic of Macedonia national football team. He has earned a total of 50 caps, scoring 4 goals. His final international was an October 2011 European Championship qualification match against Slovakia.

International goals

Club statistics

 Assist Goals

Honours

Teams

Macedonian First League:
winner: Vardar Skopje – 2003,2015
Macedonian Cup
runner-up: Cementarnica 55 Skopje 2002
Cypriot First Division
runner-up: AC Omonia 2006, AC Omonia 2007
Serbian Superliga:
runner-up: FK Vojvodina 2009
Cypriot Cup:
winner: AC Omonia 2005
runner-up: AC Omonia 2007
Cyprus FA Shield:
winner: AC Omonia – 2006
Hazfi Cup:
runner-up: Persepolis – 2013

Individual
Macedonian First League young Player of the year:
2002–2003Cypriot First Division young foreign Player of the year:
2006–2007

References

External links
Profile at MacedonianFootball.com 

Persepolis signs Macedonian Vlatko Grozdanosk
 Grozdanoski: Iranian second league is better than Macedonian first league

1983 births
Living people
Footballers from Skopje
Association football midfielders
Macedonian footballers
North Macedonia youth international footballers
North Macedonia under-21 international footballers
North Macedonia international footballers
FK Cementarnica 55 players
FK Vardar players
AC Omonia players
FK Vojvodina players
AEL Limassol players
Damash Iranian players
Liaoning F.C. players
Persepolis F.C. players
Macedonian First Football League players
Cypriot First Division players
Serbian SuperLiga players
Azadegan League players
Chinese Super League players
Persian Gulf Pro League players
Macedonian expatriate footballers
Expatriate footballers in Serbia
Macedonian expatriate sportspeople in Serbia
Expatriate footballers in Cyprus
Macedonian expatriate sportspeople in Cyprus
Expatriate footballers in Iran
Macedonian expatriate sportspeople in Iran
Expatriate footballers in China
Macedonian expatriate sportspeople in China